The First term of Fernando Chui Sai On as Chief Executive of Macau, officially considered part of "The 3rd term Chief Executive of Macau", relates to the period of governance of Macau since the transfer of sovereignty of Macau, between 20 December 2009 and 20 December 2014. Fernando Chui Sai On was elected in mid 2009 by 300-member Selection Committee as the second Chief Executive of Macau.

Cabinet

Ministry
The policy bureaux were under several reorganisations during the term as following:

|}

Executive Council members
The Executive Council was presided by President Fernando Chui Sai On and consisted of total 11 members. All members are appointed by the Chief Executive from among members of the Legislative Council and other influential public personnels.

The Convenor of the members was Leong Heng Teng.

References

Government of Macau